Fifteen and Pregnant is a 1998 American drama television film directed by Sam Pillsbury, written by Susan Cuscuna, and starring Kirsten Dunst, Park Overall, David Andrews, and Margot Demeter. Based on a true story, Dunst portrays a 15-year-old pregnant girl. It premiered on Lifetime on January 19, 1998.

Plot
14-year-old Tina has sex with her new boyfriend, Ray. Ray later ends his relationship with Tina, telling her that he must focus upon his athletic goals. When Tina discovers that she has started her period, she is extremely relieved. On Tina's 15th birthday, she is despondent because another birthday has passed and she does not have a boyfriend.

Tensions arise between Tina and her mother when they are in the car together and listen to a radio program where the commentator makes remarks about the high number of teenagers getting pregnant. Tina's mother asks her daughter if she knows anyone who is sexually active, or if she has ever been sexually active. Tina is evasive and gives a non-committal response. She and her friend Laurie, a young mother who became pregnant at 17, attend a sexual health clinic where it is confirmed that Tina is pregnant.

It all comes to a head when Laurie tells Tina to tell her mother about the pregnancy. Her mother, a conservative Christian, is shocked but due to her beliefs, decides to help her daughter. Her dad is less upset and comforts his daughter. When Tina tells Ray, he feigns happiness and acts like he wants to be with her. Tina begins pregnancy classes with her mother. After hearing a story from a girl about how hard teenage motherhood is and how her boyfriend cheated on her, Tina calls Ray and yells at him because she thinks he won't be a good father as he promised he would be. She tries to make him stay with her, but when Ray isn't as present as she'd hoped, Tina is suspicious. At the mall she finds Ray kissing another girl, cheating on her. She is upset and tells him she is over him and ends their relationship.

Throughout the stressful pregnancy, Tina's younger sister Rachel reacts with both disgust and jealousy to the attention Tina receives from her concerned parents. Even when Rachel breaks her ankle, Tina receives more attention. In one instance, Rachel loses her place on the couch because Tina wants it; Rachel is told to go upstairs on her crutches if she wants to lie down. Exasperated, Rachel calls their grandmother to ask permission to live with her. As the pregnancy becomes overwhelming, Tina is rushed to the hospital and is about to give birth when her mother has a panic attack on how her daughter is going to have a baby. When Tina is in labor, Ray shows up at the hospital with his new girlfriend only to be turned away by Tina's father, telling him "sperm doesn't entitle you to much" and making him go to the waiting room. After a grueling labor, Tina gives birth to a baby boy whom she names Caleb. She meets her younger sister and grandmother outside the hospital where they all have a small family reunion.

Cast
 Kirsten Dunst as Tina Spangler
 Park Overall as Evie Spangler
 David Andrews as Cal Spangler
 Margot Demeter as Laurie Walsh
 Julia Whelan as Rachel Spangler 
 Zachary Ray Sherman as Adam Spangler
 Daniel Kountz as Ray Wood
 Marlyn Mason as Grandmom Spangler 
 Katee Sackhoff as Karen Gotatus
 Karen Johnson Miller as Coach Mary
 Karen Trumbo as Jane Walsh
 Tyler Gannon as Melody
 Sherilyn Lawson as Dr. Ross
 Joe Ivy as Dr. Warsaw
 Rebecca Nachison as Mrs. Knapp
 Jan Brehm as Mrs. Crawley
 Angela Uherbelau as Carmela
 Kaci Baxter as Holly
 Skylar Thiel-Klare and Karina Thiel-Klare as Allison Wales
 Victor Morris as Tom

External links

1998 films
1998 drama films
1998 in American television
1990s English-language films
1990s pregnancy films
1990s teen drama films
American drama television films
American films based on actual events
American pregnancy films
American teen drama films
Drama films based on actual events
Films about infidelity
Films directed by Sam Pillsbury
Films set in 1989
Films set in 1990
Films shot in Portland, Oregon
Lifetime (TV network) films
Teenage pregnancy in film
Teenage pregnancy in television
Television films based on actual events
1990s American films